The Soluch concentration camp was an Italian concentration camp in Suluq (also known as Soluch) in the Italian colony of Libya during the Pacification of Libya that took place from 1928 to 1932. It was here that the famous Senussi anti-colonial rebel leader Omar Mukhtar was executed. The camp is recorded as having a population of 20,123 people.

See also
 Italian concentration camps
 Italian concentration camps in Libya
 Italian Libya
 Pacification of Libya

References

Italian Libya
Italian concentration camps
Internment camps in Libya